Tarnished Heisman: Did Reggie Bush Turn His Final College Season into a Six-Figure Job? is a book written by Don Yaeger.  The book details the alleged payments to former USC Trojans player and former NFL player Reggie Bush while still a student in college.  The book was released on January 15, 2007.

External links
FoxSports.com: Tarnished Heisman details Bush's benefits
WashingtonPost.com: Book Says Bush Received Cash From Marketer at USC

American football books
2008 non-fiction books
2007 Pacific-10 Conference football season
USC Trojans football